Max & Moritz are a pair of duelling powered roller coasters manufactured by Mack Rides opened in 2020 at theme park Efteling in the Netherlands. The coasters replace the bobsled roller coaster at the same location, with both attractions utilising the station building of their predecessor. The ride is based on the 1865 German illustrated story Max and Moritz by Wilhelm Busch.

History

Announcement
In October 2018, the park simultaneously announced the intention to close the Bob Track and the replacement by Max & Moritz. The by then 34 year old roller coaster was enduring frequent breakdowns, and Intamin was no longer producing this type of attraction. The park delayed an expansion near Vogel Rok and moved up the Bob's replacement. The ride would officially close for good in September 2019. Max & Moritz was announced to be intended as a family coaster, with a required height of 100 centimeters. Costs were estimated to be .

Construction

Preparations for construction began in June 2019. Trees in the intended construction area were cut down and several access roads were widened. The Bob Track closed on 1 September 2019, and demolition of the former Intamin bobsled coaster commenced the following day to allow for construction of the new attractions to begin.

By December 2019, all supports were in place and the highest construction point was reached. The first track parts arrived in January 2020, and the whole track was completed after one week and a half. The first train coaches arrived in March 2020, and the first test run of the blue Max track was completed on the 13th of March.

Ride experience 

The coaster consists of two tracks, the blue Max and green Moritz tracks. Both tracks run in opposite direction. The maximum speed will be 36 km/h. Each track has one train, which consists of a locomotive and nine more coaches, for a total of 38 passengers per train. The coaster will have a capacity of 1800 riders per hour.

References

Efteling
Roller coasters in the Netherlands
2020 establishments in the Netherlands
21st-century architecture in the Netherlands